False Cathedrals is the second studio album by American emo band Elliott. It was released in August of 2000.

Track listing

References

2000 albums
Elliott (band) albums
Revelation Records albums